The Saurer M6 (also called Saurer M6 M) is a 6x6 truck model, which established the Adolph Saurer AG in 1940. The payload of 2.5 tons.

The Swiss Army ordered 338 Saurer M6s in 1940; an additional 16 came with solid construction as radio trucks. Almost identical was the 8x8 model Saurer M8 M, inclusive the prototype 79 M8 trucks were built. Many components of the Saurer M6 also found use in the Saurer MH4. The Saurer 2DM replaced in 1978 the Sauer M6 in Military service, some of them found a second use by the Civil defense of Switzerland.

Preserved examples
A Saurer M6 radio car is now in the Flieger-Flab-Museum (Air Force Museum) at Dübendorf.  Normal transporter versions  are now in the Zuger Depot Technikgeschichte and the Schweizerische Militärmuseum Full.

References
 Kurt Sahli, Jo Wiedmer: Saurer. Nutzfahrzeuge damals und heute. Buri, Bern 1983, .
  Saurer M6 Technical infos in German.
  Saurer M6 Funkwagen Technical infos in German.
  Saurer M8 Technical infos in German.
 Fahrzeuge der Schweizer Armee by Markus Hofmann (2000)
 Klaus Fischer: Feuerwehrfahrzeuge in der Schweiz.Feuerwehr-Archiv. Verlag Technik Berlin 2000, 

Military vehicles introduced from 1940 to 1944
Off-road vehicles
Military trucks of Switzerland